Sébastien Grosjean and Nicolas Kiefer were the defending champions but lost in the quarterfinals to Kenneth Carlsen and Xavier Malisse.

Jan-Michael Gambill and Travis Parrott won in the final 6–4, 3–6, 7–5 against Joshua Eagle and Sjeng Schalken.

Seeds

  Rick Leach /  Brian MacPhie (quarterfinals)
  David Adams /  Andrew Kratzmann (first round)
  Scott Humphries /  Mark Merklein (semifinals)
  Joshua Eagle /  Sjeng Schalken (final)

Draw

External links
 2003 Mercedes-Benz Cup Doubles draw

Los Angeles Open (tennis)
2003 ATP Tour